Albert Cole Hopkins (September 15, 1837 – June 9, 1911) was a Republican member of the U.S. House of Representatives from Pennsylvania.

Biography
Born in Villenova, New York, Hopkins graduated from Alfred University in Alfred, New York. He taught school, and engaged in mercantile pursuits in Troy, Pennsylvania. In 1867, he moved to Lock Haven, Pennsylvania, where he engaged in the lumber business.

Hopkins was elected as a Republican to the Fifty-second and Fifty-third Congresses. He was not a candidate for renomination in 1894.

He resumed his lumber manufacturing pursuits. Appointed as the state forestry commissioner from 1899 to 1904, Hopkins also served as a delegate to the 1900 and 1904 Republican National Conventions.

Death
Hopkins died in Lock Haven, Pennsylvania, in 1911, and was interred in the Highland Cemetery.

References

External links

Alfred University alumni
1837 births
1911 deaths
People from Clinton County, Pennsylvania
People from Chautauqua County, New York
Republican Party members of the United States House of Representatives from Pennsylvania
19th-century American politicians